Dayanand Sarveshwar Nadkarni (1910–2000) was an activist, a freedom fighter, and a Member of the legislative assembly to the Karnataka State, Bangalore during 1967-1971 (from Ankola Constituency as a Praja Socialist Party candidate), when Veerendra Patil was the Chief Minister of the Karnataka state. Nadkarni was also the founder member of The Kanara Welfare Trust.

Early career

D. S. Nadkarni was originally from Bankikodla village. Around 1955, Nadkarni migrated to Ankola to work with Dinakara Desai; Nadkarni was right hand-man of Dinakara Desai. Nadkarni was a member of the Rural Education Society of the Chitrapur Saraswats who founded the A. H. School.

References

Konkani people
Konkani
Mysore MLAs 1967–1972
1910 births
2000 deaths
People from Uttara Kannada
Praja Socialist Party politicians
20th-century Indian politicians